Pelecopsis is a genus of dwarf spiders that was first described by Eugène Louis Simon in 1864.

Species
 it contains ninety-two species and four subspecies:
P. agaetensis Wunderlich, 1987 – Canary Is.
P. albifrons Holm, 1979 – Kenya
P. alpica Thaler, 1991 – Switzerland, Austria, Italy
P. alticola (Berland, 1936) – Kenya
Pelecopsis a. elgonensis (Holm, 1962) – Uganda
Pelecopsis a. kenyensis (Holm, 1962) – Kenya
Pelecopsis a. kivuensis (Miller, 1970) – Congo
P. amabilis (Simon, 1884) – Algeria
P. aureipes Denis, 1962 – Morocco
P. biceps (Holm, 1962) – Tanzania
P. bicornuta Hillyard, 1980 – Spain, Morocco
P. bigibba Seo, 2018 – Korea
P. bishopi Kaston, 1945 – USA
P. brunea Seo, 2018 – Korea
P. bucephala (O. Pickard-Cambridge, 1875) – Western Mediterranean
P. capitata (Simon, 1884) – France
P. cedricola Bosmans & Abrous, 1992 – Algeria
P. coccinea (O. Pickard-Cambridge, 1875) – Spain, Morocco
P. crassipes Tanasevitch, 1987 – Russia, Central Asia
P. denisi Brignoli, 1983 – Andorra, France
P. digitulus Bosmans & Abrous, 1992 – Algeria, France (Corsica)
P. dorniana Heimer, 1987 – Russia, Mongolia
P. elongata (Wider, 1834) (type) – Europe, Israel
P. eminula (Simon, 1884) – Spain, France, Italy
P. flava Holm, 1962 – Uganda, Congo
P. fornicata Miller, 1970 – Congo
P. fulva Holm, 1962 – Uganda
P. hamata Bosmans, 1988 – Cameroon
P. hipporegia (Denis, 1968) – Algeria, Tunisia
P. humiliceps Holm, 1979 – Kenya, Uganda
P. indus Tanasevitch, 2011 – India, Pakistan
P. inedita (O. Pickard-Cambridge, 1875) – Canary Is., Mediterranean
P. infusca Holm, 1962 – Uganda
P. intricata Jocqué, 1984 – South Africa
P. janus Jocqué, 1984 – South Africa, Lesotho
P. kabyliana Bosmans & Abrous, 1992 – Algeria
P. kalaensis Bosmans & Abrous, 1992 – Algeria
P. laptevi Tanasevitch & Fet, 1986 – Macedonia, Ukraine, Iran, Central Asia
P. leonina (Simon, 1884) – Algeria
P. levantensis Tanasevitch, 2016 – Israel
P. litoralis Wunderlich, 1987 – Canary Is.
P. loksai Szinetár & Samu, 2003 – Hungary, Macedonia
P. lunaris Bosmans & Abrous, 1992 – Algeria
P. major (Denis, 1945) – Algeria
P. malawiensis Jocqué, 1977 – Malawi
P. margaretae Georgescu, 1975 – Romania
P. medusoides Jocqué, 1984 – South Africa
P. mengei (Simon, 1884) – North America, Europe, Russia (European to Far East), Japan
P. minor Wunderlich, 1995 – Mongolia
P. modica Hillyard, 1980 – Spain, Morocco
P. moesta (Banks, 1892) – USA
P. monsantensis Bosmans & Crespo, 2010 – Portugal
P. montana Seo, 2018 – Korea
P. moschensis (Caporiacco, 1947) – Tanzania
P. mutica Denis, 1958 – France
P. nigriceps Holm, 1962 – Kenya, Uganda
P. nigroloba Fei, Gao & Zhu, 1995 – Russia, China
P. odontophora (Kulczyński, 1895) – Georgia
P. oranensis (Simon, 1884) – Morocco, Algeria
P. oujda Bosmans & Abrous, 1992 – Morocco
P. palmgreni Marusik & Esyunin, 1998 – Russia, Kazakhstan
P. papillii Scharff, 1990 – Tanzania
P. parallela (Wider, 1834) – Europe, Turkey, Russia to Kazakhstan
P. paralleloides Tanasevitch & Fet, 1986 – Central Asia
P. partita Denis, 1954 – France
P. parvicollis Wunderlich, 1995 – Mongolia
P. parvioculis Miller, 1970 – Angola
P. pasteuri (Berland, 1936) – Tanzania
P. pavesii 	Bosmans & Hervé, 2021 – Tunisia
P. pavida (O. Pickard-Cambridge, 1872) – Greece, Israel
P. physeter (Fage, 1936) – Congo, Rwanda, Kenya, Tanzania
P. pooti Bosmans & Jocqué, 1993 – Spain
P. proclinata Bosmans, 1988 – Cameroon
P. punctilineata Holm, 1964 – Congo, Rwanda
P. punctiseriata (Bösenberg & Strand, 1906) – Japan
P. radicicola (L. Koch, 1872) – Europe
P. reclinata (Holm, 1962) – Kenya, Uganda
P. riffensis Bosmans & Abrous, 1992 – Morocco
P. robusta Weiss, 1990 – Romania
P. ruwenzoriensis (Holm, 1962) – Uganda
P. sanje Scharff, 1990 – Tanzania
P. sculpta (Emerton, 1917) – Canada
Pelecopsis s. digna Chamberlin & Ivie, 1939 – USA
P. senecicola Holm, 1962 – Uganda
P. subflava Russell-Smith & Jocqué, 1986 – Kenya
P. suilla (Simon, 1884) – Algeria
P. susannae (Simon, 1915) – Portugal, France, Britain
P. tenuipalpis Holm, 1979 – Uganda
P. topcui (Türkeş, Karabulut, Demir & Seyyar, 2015) – Turkey
P. tybaertielloides Jocqué, 1984 – Kenya
P. unimaculata (Banks, 1892) – USA
P. varians (Holm, 1962) – Kenya, Uganda

See also
 List of Linyphiidae species (I–P)

References

Araneomorphae genera
Linyphiidae
Spiders of Africa
Spiders of Asia
Spiders of North America